The Niagara Falls Thunder was a junior ice hockey team in the Ontario Hockey League from 1988 to 1996. The team was based in Niagara Falls, Ontario.

History
Niagara Falls became home to its third OHL franchise in 1988 upon the relocation of the Hamilton Steelhawks.  The new team was named the Niagara Falls Thunder. The team filled the void left behind when the Niagara Falls Flyers departed for North Bay in 1982. 
 
The Thunder picked up on the winning note of the Steelhawks' last season in Hamilton. Coach Bill LaForge returned with a strong core of players that lead the team to a second-place finish in 1988–89. Niagara Falls reached the OHL finals the first year in their new home city, losing to the Peterborough Petes.

Many players graduated from the OHL after that season and the Thunder began to rebuild for 1989–90. Shortly into the season, growing tensions between team owner Rick Gay and coach Bill LaForge led to the coach being fired. LaForge was never forgiven by the fans for perhaps costing the team a chance of the Memorial Cup in 1989.

The Thunder hired the younger and up-and-coming Oshawa Generals' assistant coach George Burnett to take over. The team rallied from out of the playoffs to 6th place. Niagara Falls continued its momentum into the third round of the playoffs knocking off the first place London Knights before losing to the Kitchener Rangers.

The Thunder finished the next two seasons in second place, and made it to the third round of the playoffs both years, a feat they managed four years in a row. Coach Burnett was voted Coach of the Year for 1990–91 and 1991–92. Both years their playoff nemesis, the Sault Ste. Marie Greyhounds, eliminated them in the semi-finals.

Many players graduated in 1992 for professional careers, and Coach Burnett was promoted to the Cape Breton Oilers of the AHL. He won the Calder Cup with the team in 1992–93.

The team never regained its strength of the first four seasons. After three poor seasons on the ice from 1992–93 to 1994–95, game attendance was dropping. This, combined with rescheduling of Sunday games to Saturday nights, and an aging arena with no new arena deal in sight, resulted in the Thunder moving to Erie, Pennsylvania, to play as the Otters.

Coaches
George Burnett was voted the OHL Coach of the Year in the 1990–91 and 1991–92 seasons, winning the Matt Leyden Trophy in only his first and second full seasons as a head coach in the OHL.

Players

Award winners
1988–89 - Bryan Fogarty, CHL Player of the Year & CHL Defenceman of the Year Award;  Red Tilson Trophy, Most Outstanding Player; Eddie Powers Memorial Trophy, Scoring Champion; Max Kaminsky Trophy, Most Outstanding Defenceman
1988–89 - Stan Drulia, Jim Mahon Memorial Trophy, Top Scoring Right Winger, Leo Lalonde Memorial Trophy, Overage Player of the Year
1989–90 - Keith Primeau, Eddie Powers Memorial Trophy, Scoring Champion
1991–92 - Todd Simon, Red Tilson Trophy, Most Outstanding Player; Eddie Powers Memorial Trophy, Scoring Champion
1991–92 - Manny Legace, OHL Goaltender of the Year
1993–94 - Ethan Moreau, Bobby Smith Trophy, Scholastic Player of the Year

NHL alumni

Yearly results

Regular season

Playoffs

Arena
The Niagara Falls Thunder played home games at Niagara Falls Memorial Arena from 1988 to 1996.

Niagara Falls Memorial Arena - The OHL Arena & Travel Guide

Defunct Ontario Hockey League teams
Sport in Niagara Falls, Ontario